The Ravens–Steelers rivalry is a National Football League (NFL) rivalry between the Baltimore Ravens and the Pittsburgh Steelers. It is widely considered to be one of the greatest, most intense, and physical rivalries in the NFL. Both teams are members of the American Football Conference North (AFC North) division (formerly the AFC Central). Since the Ravens' inception in 1996, they have played at least twice a year, often for divisional supremacy. Both teams are known for fielding tough, hard-hitting defensive squads, giving their games an extra element of physical intensity. 

The Steelers lead the overall series, 33–25.  The two teams have met in the postseason four times, with the Steelers owning a 3–1 advantage. They are the only two teams in the AFC North to have won the Super Bowl; the Steelers have six Super Bowl titles and the Ravens have two, with each team winning two titles since the rivalry started.

Characteristics
In Baltimore, this rivalry has the added element of a small number of former Baltimore Colts fans in the area becoming Steelers fans after the Colts moved, then retaining their affiliation with the Steelers after the Ravens began play in Baltimore as a division rival of the Steelers. In Pittsburgh, it is considered the spiritual successor to the Browns–Steelers rivalry due to the Browns' relocation to Baltimore, as well as the "reactivated" Browns' poor record against the Steelers since returning to the league in 1999. Due to its physical nature, it has received comparisons to the Steelers' rivalry with the Oakland Raiders in the 1970s, when those two teams were among the most physical teams in the league.  Both teams have also handed each other their first loss in their current stadiums; the Steelers handed the Ravens their first loss at PSINet Stadium (now M&T Bank Stadium) in 1998, while the Ravens returned the favor by handing the Steelers their first loss at Heinz Field (now Acrisure Stadium) in 2001.

A notable battleground for the rivalry is the Harrisburg, Pennsylvania market area. Harrisburg is officially a secondary market for the Ravens, and so CBS affiliate WHP-TV must show all Ravens Sunday afternoon away games. The Steelers also have a significant fan base in the area, so when the Ravens are at home, the Steelers are shown instead. The Harrisburg area also has a significant fan base for the Philadelphia Eagles, who also have Harrisburg as a secondary market (but are in the NFC, so Fox affiliate WPMT usually shows the Eagles). The Colts had a number of fans in Harrisburg as well during their stay in Baltimore.

In 2005, Sports Illustrated ranked the rivalry #2 on a list of "Top 10 New NFL Rivalries". By 2015, Bleacher Report had ranked it the #1 rivalry in all of the NFL. One of the rivalry's most memorable moments was Ravens linebacker Terrell Suggs being quoted as saying that a "bounty" was put out on the head of Steelers wide receiver Hines Ward. The bounty controversy was cleared up when Suggs insisted his words were just meant as a joke. The NFL investigated, and Suggs was cleared of any wrongdoing.

History

1996–2007: Creation of the Ravens
In 1996, NFL football returned to Baltimore, 12 years after the original Baltimore Colts moved to Indianapolis. In a strange twist of fate, Art Modell, former owner of the Steelers' traditional rival, the Cleveland Browns, agreed to suspend the Browns franchise in return for taking his players and personnel to Baltimore, creating the Baltimore Ravens expansion franchise. The inter-divisional rivalry carried over with both teams remaining in what was then the AFC Central Division.

The Ravens and Steelers first met on September 8, 1996, at Three Rivers Stadium in Pittsburgh, which resulted in a 31–17 win for the Steelers. Later in the 1996 NFL season, on December 1, the Ravens beat the Steelers 31–17 at Memorial Stadium in Baltimore. After splitting the games in their first season together, the Steelers would go on to mostly dominate the series in the early years, winning eight of eleven meetings (including a 2001 Divisional Playoff game) before the AFC Central was restructured into the AFC North in 2002. From 2002 to 2007, the rivals split their games 6–6, signaling a more competitive and fierce era for the rivalry.

2008–2018: Flacco vs. Roethlisberger
The rivalry reached a new height of intensity during the 2008 NFL season, when the Ravens and Steelers played three times, the final match being the AFC Championship game.  The Steelers won all three games by close margins. In Week 4 at Pittsburgh, the Steelers won on a 46–yard field goal in overtime. In Week 15 at Baltimore, the Steelers beat the Ravens with a controversial score late in the game. Also, as a result, the Steelers won the AFC North championship. In the playoff game, a personal foul by special teams player Daren Stone cost the Ravens 25 yards. The game's last score was an interception that was returned for a touchdown by Troy Polamalu, sealing a 23–14 victory for Pittsburgh. In that same game the Steelers' Ryan Clark delivered a concussion-inducing, but legal hit on the Ravens' Willis McGahee that left Clark briefly out cold and forced McGahee to spend the night in a Pittsburgh hospital. The Steelers went on to win Super Bowl XLIII against the Arizona Cardinals.

The bitter rivalry continued in the 2009 NFL season; the Ravens won 20–17 at M&T Bank Stadium and the Steelers won 23–20 at Heinz Field. Both the Ravens and the Steelers finished the season with 9–7 records, but Baltimore won a Wild Card slot over Pittsburgh due to a better division record.

On the opening Sunday of the 2011 NFL season, the Ravens forced seven turnovers and routed the Steelers 35–7 at home. During Week 9 of the season, the Steelers were on the verge of winning the rematch at Heinz Field. The Steelers were ready to potentially increase their lead with a 47–yard field goal kick by Shaun Suisham, but a 5–yard delay of game penalty put them out of field goal range and they instead decided to punt the ball to the Ravens. In the end, Ravens quarterback Joe Flacco threw a 26–yard touchdown pass to wide receiver Torrey Smith in the end zone with just eight seconds remaining, giving the Ravens the win and a season sweep of the Steelers. This would mark the last time Ravens linebacker Ray Lewis would play against the Steelers, as he was injured during the teams' two meetings in 2012 and retired following his win in Super Bowl XLVII.

In the  season, the Ravens and Steelers split their games; the road team won each meeting.  The Ravens won their second consecutive AFC North title and won Super Bowl XLVII against the San Francisco 49ers.

On Thanksgiving , the Ravens defeated the Steelers 22–20, preventing a last-minute 2–point conversion and forcing a split between the rivals for the season. The game included an infamous moment when Steelers head coach Mike Tomlin intentionally stepped onto the field interfering with a Jacoby Jones kickoff return, eventually resulting in a $100,000 fine for Tomlin.

In Week 2 of the  season, the Ravens beat the Steelers 26–6 at M&T Bank Stadium, which marked the first time since 2011 that the Steelers did not score a touchdown in a game. In Week 9, the Steelers defeated the Ravens 43–23 at Heinz Field. Both games were decided by 20 points, which is unusual for Ravens–Steelers games.  Though the Steelers went on to win the AFC North with an 11–5 record, the 10–6 Ravens would earn their first playoff victory over their rival on January 3, 2015, with a 30–17 win at Heinz Field in the Wild Card round, in the game Ravens linebacker Terrell Suggs (who had public comments against Steelers Quarterback Ben Roethliesberger years before) caught a game sealing interception with his legs.

Behind a defense that shut out the Steelers for the first three quarters, the Ravens won 21–14, taking the lead in the division and evening the teams' records at 4–4. In the rematch at Heinz Field on Christmas Day, the 9–5 Steelers prevailed over the 8–6 Ravens in a back-and-forth game, 31–27. With nine seconds remaining, Steelers receiver Antonio Brown scored the game's final points by reaching over the goal line. The win secured the AFC North championship for Pittsburgh and eliminated Baltimore from playoff contention.

The tightest game in the rivalry was a 39–38 Steelers win in Week 14 of 2017.  The Ravens erased Steelers leads of 14-0 and 17-7 to lead 38-29 in the fourth quarter but the Steelers scored ten points in the final four minutes.  Roethlisberger had 506 passing yards in the game. 

The teams split their  meetings, both winning on the road.  In Week 4, The teams met in Pittsburgh for a Sunday Night Football showdown. The Ravens jumped out to a 14–0 lead in the first quarter, but following a Pittsburgh field goal and then a fumble by Ravens running back Alex Collins near the Steelers' goal line, the Steelers gained momentum and tied the game 14–14 at halftime. However, in the second half, the Ravens pulled away by kicking four field goals and shutting out the Steelers' offense, making the final score 26–14 in favor of Baltimore. In the rematch in Week 9, the Steelers defeated the Ravens 23–16, which included Joe Flacco's final start as a Raven due to an injury and later being benched in favor of rookie quarterback Lamar Jackson. In the final week of the season, the 9–6 Ravens hosted the Cleveland Browns while the 8–6–1 Steelers hosted the Cincinnati Bengals. The Steelers needed a win and a Ravens loss to win their third consecutive division championship, while the Ravens simply needed a win to clinch the AFC North. While the Steelers were able to win, the Ravens topped the Browns 26–24, which gave Baltimore the AFC North title. Steelers players and fans stayed to watch the end of the Ravens game on the jumbotron at Heinz Field after the game.  Steelers fans were actively cheering for the Browns (with whom the Steelers also share a rivalry). The Steelers employees had to take "AFC North Division Champions" shirts that were in boxes on the field off after the Ravens won.

2019–present: Lamar Jackson arrives, Roethlisberger leaves
During the  offseason, the Ravens traded Joe Flacco to the Denver Broncos and named Lamar Jackson as their starting quarterback moving forward. Meanwhile, Ben Roethlisberger's 2019 season ended in Week 2 after suffering a season-ending elbow injury, leaving Mason Rudolph as the Steelers' starting quarterback.

The 2–2 Ravens met the 1–3 Steelers in Week 5 in Pittsburgh as both teams looked to assert their position in a three-team race for the AFC North, along with the 2–2 Cleveland Browns. This physical game, which was Jackson's first career start against the Steelers, included several injuries, including a hard hit from safety Earl Thomas on Rudolph in the third quarter, requiring the Steelers to replace him with third string QB Devlin Hodges. The game was close throughout and eventually went into overtime, where the Ravens won 26–23 after Ravens CB Marlon Humphrey forced Steelers WR JuJu Smith-Schuster to fumble, setting up Baltimore's game-winning field goal.  In the final week of the season, the Ravens, having already clinched the AFC's #1 seed, rested their starters for this game and won 28-10, sweeping the Steelers for the first time since 2015 and ending their hopes for a playoff spot while earning their second consecutive AFC North title with a franchise-best record of 14–2.

On December 2, 2020, the Ravens traveled to Pittsburgh for a rare Wednesday game after their game, originally scheduled for Thanksgiving 
was postponed due to a COVID-19 outbreak among the Ravens. The Ravens were missing several starters, including Jackson. Leading 19-14 with under a minute remaining, Steelers RB Benny Snell was thought to have been short of the line to gain to set up 4th and inches. However, this was overturned and Pittsburgh was awarded a first down and could run out the clock on the Ravens, who were out of time outs.  Combined with an earlier win in Baltimore, this marked the Steelers' first season sweep of the Ravens since 2017.

On October 3, 2021, the Ravens tied a record set by the 1974–1977 Steelers for most consecutive games (43) rushing over 100 yards as a team.  The Ravens' streak dated back to the 2018 season. On December 5, the Steelers took the first matchup of the 2021 season with a 20–19 victory, in which Baltimore unsuccessfully attempted a 2-point conversion on a last-minute touchdown that would have given them the win. They completed the season sweep during the final week of the season on January 9, 2022, beating the Ravens in overtime with a field goal by Chris Boswell to stay alive in the playoff race, as Indianapolis had lost earlier that day. This win, combined with a win by the Raiders later that evening, not only eliminated the Ravens from playoff contention, but sent the Steelers to the playoffs in what would prove to be Roethlisberger's final NFL season, as he would announce his retirement on January 27, 2022.

December 11, 2022 marked the 32nd matchup between head coaches John Harbaugh and Mike Tomlin, surpassing Curly Lambeau and Steve Owen for the second-most head-to-head matchups between head coaches in NFL history (the current record is held by Lambeau and George Halas with 49). Kenny Pickett made his first start against the Ravens in Pittsburgh, however it would be short lived, as he would sustain a hit from Ravens linebacker Roquan Smith during the Steelers opening drive, forcing him to leave the game. In relief, Mitch Trubisky would come out in relief but throw 3 interceptions in a 16-14 loss that would also see Ravens backup Quarterback Tyler Huntley who was already starting in relief of Lamar Jackson go down as well, forcing Baltimore to start Anthony Brown. On January 1, 2023, in Baltimore, Pickett would make his second start, throwing for 168 yards and 1 touchdown in a close 16-13 win.

Season-by-season results 

|-
| 
| Tie 1–1
| style="| Ravens  31–17
| style="| Steelers  31–17
| Tie  1–1
| Ravens' inaugural season.
|-
| 
| style="| 
| style="| Steelers  42–34
| style="| Steelers  37–0
| Steelers  3–1
| Steelers' 37–0 win is the largest margin of victory in the history of the rivalry.
|-
| 
| style="| 
| style="| Steelers  20–13
| style="| Steelers  16–6
| Steelers  5–1
| Ravens open M&T Bank Stadium (then known as Ravens Stadium at Camden Yards).
|-
| 
| Tie 1–1
| style="| Steelers  23–20
| style="| Ravens  31–24
| Steelers  6–2
| In the game in Pittsburgh, Ravens wide receiver Qadry Ismail scored three touchdowns with 258 receiving yards, the all-time record at Three Rivers Stadium.
|-

|-
| 
| Tie 1–1
| style="| Steelers  9–6
| style="| Ravens  16–0
| Steelers  7–3
| Ravens win Super Bowl XXXV.
|-
| 
| Tie 1–1
| style="| Steelers  26–21
| style="| Ravens  13–10
| Steelers  8–4
| Steelers open Heinz Field.
|- style="font-weight:bold; background:#f2f2f2;"
| 2001 Playoffs
| style="| 
|
| style="| Steelers  27–10
| Steelers  9–4
| AFC Divisional playoffs, first playoff meeting between the two teams.
|-
| 
| style="| 
| style="| Steelers  31–18
| style="| Steelers  34–31
| Steelers  11–4
| 
|-
| 
| Tie 1–1
| style="| Ravens  13–10(OT)
| style="| Steelers  34–15
| Steelers  12–5
| 
|-
| 
| Tie 1–1
| style="| Ravens  30–13
| style="| Steelers  20–7
| Steelers  13–6
| Ravens' win in Baltimore was Steelers' only loss in 15–1 season. Ben Roethlisberger made his NFL debut in that game after Tommy Maddox suffered an injury.
|-
| 
| Tie 1–1
| style="| Ravens  16–13(OT)
| style="| Steelers  20–19
| Steelers  14–7
| Steelers win Super Bowl XL.
|-
| 
| style="| 
| style="| Ravens  27–0
| style="| Ravens  31–7
| Steelers  14–9
| Ravens sweep season series for the first time.
|-
| 
| Tie 1–1
| style="| Ravens  27–21
| style="| Steelers  38–7
| Steelers  15–10
| 
|-
| 
| style="| 
| style="| Steelers  13–9
| style="| Steelers  23–20(OT)
| Steelers  17–10
| Ravens draft quarterback Joe Flacco. Steelers clinch AFC North by winning the game in Baltimore. Steelers win Super Bowl XLIII.
|- style="font-weight:bold; background:#f2f2f2;"
| 2008 Playoffs
| style="| 
|
| style="| Steelers  23–14
| Steelers  18–10
| AFC Championship Game.
|-
| 
| Tie 1–1
| style="| Ravens  20–17(OT)
| style="| Steelers  23–20
| Steelers  19–11
| 
|-

|-
| 
| Tie 1–1
| style="| Steelers  13–10
| style="| Ravens  17–14
| Steelers  20–12
| Steelers lose Super Bowl XLV.
|- style="font-weight:bold; background:#f2f2f2;"
| 2010 Playoffs
| style="| 
|
| style="| Steelers  31–24
| Steelers  21–12
| AFC Divisional playoffs. Pittsburgh overcomes a 21–7 deficit in the second half to advance.
|-
| 
| style="| 
| style="| Ravens  35–7
| style="| Ravens  23–20
| Steelers  21–14
| 
|-
| 
| Tie 1–1
| style="| Steelers  23–20
| style="| Ravens  13–10
| Steelers  22–15
| Ray Lewis and Ben Roethlisberger miss both meetings due to injury. Ravens win Super Bowl XLVII.
|-
| 
| Tie 1–1
| style="| Ravens  22–20
| style="| Steelers  19–16
| Steelers  23–16
| Game in Baltimore played on Thanksgiving. Steelers head coach Mike Tomlin infamously steps onto field of play during Ravens' kickoff return.
|-
| 
| Tie 1–1
| style="| Ravens  26–6
| style="| Steelers  43–23
| Steelers  24–17
| Ben Roethlisberger throws for six touchdown passes in the game in Pittsburgh.
|- style="font-weight:bold; background:#f2f2f2;"
| 2014 Playoffs
| style="| 
|
| style="| Ravens  30–17
| Steelers  24–18
| AFC Wild Card playoffs, Ravens' first postseason win over Steelers.
|-
| 
| style="| 
| style="| Ravens  20–17
| style="| Ravens  23–20(OT)
| Steelers  24–20
| Ravens sweep season series despite an injury to Joe Flacco and a 5–11 season record.
|-
| 
| Tie 1–1
| style="| Ravens  21–14
| style="| Steelers  31–27
| Steelers  25–21
| Game in Pittsburgh played on Christmas Day. Steelers score a late touchdown to win and clinch the AFC North and eliminate the Ravens from playoff contention.
|-
| 
| style="| 
| style="| Steelers  26–9
| style="| Steelers  39–38
| Steelers  27–21
|
|-
| 
| Tie 1–1
| style="| Steelers  23–16
| style="| Ravens  26–14
| Steelers  28–22
| The Steelers' win in Baltimore proved to be Joe Flacco's final game as a Raven, as he would get injured and eventually benched for rookie Lamar Jackson before being traded to the Denver Broncos in the offseason.
|-
| 
| style="| 
| style="| Ravens  28–10
| style="| Ravens  26–23(OT)
| Steelers  28–24
| Steelers are knocked out of playoff contention with loss in Baltimore.
|-

|-
| 
| style="| 
| style="| Steelers  28–24
| style="| Steelers  19–14
| Steelers  30–24
| Game in Pittsburgh was to be played on Thanksgiving before being rescheduled to December 2. Steelers win their franchise-record eleventh straight game to start a season in that game.
|-
| 
| style="| 
| style="| Steelers  16–13(OT)
| style="| Steelers  20–19
| Steelers  32–24
| Steelers' Week 18 win in Baltimore led to them clinching final AFC playoff spot; the loss eliminated Baltimore from playoff contention. Final regular season start and victory for Ben Roethlisberger.
|-
| 
| Tie 1–1
| style="| Steelers  16–13
| style="| Ravens  16–14
| Steelers  33–25
|
|- 

|-
| Regular season
| style="|
| Steelers 14–13 
| Steelers 16–11
|  
|-
| Postseason
| style="|Steelers 3–1
| no games
| Steelers 3–1
| AFC Wild Card playoffs: 2014. AFC Divisional playoffs: 2001, 2010. AFC Championship Game: 2008.
|-
| Regular and postseason 
| style="|
| Steelers 14–13
| Steelers 19–12
| 
|-

Gallery

References

Further reading

External links
 Gallery of game images at baltimoresun.com (via the Wayback Machine)

 Ravens vs Steelers box scores at The Football Database

Baltimore Ravens
Pittsburgh Steelers
National Football League rivalries
Pittsburgh Steelers rivalries
Baltimore Ravens rivalries